The 2021 Rally de Portugal (also known as the Vodafone Rally de Portugal 2021) was a motor racing event for rally cars that was held over four days between 20 and 23 May 2021. It marked the fifty-fourth running of the Rally de Portugal. The event was the fourth round of the 2021 World Rally Championship, World Rally Championship-2 and World Rally Championship-3, as well as the second round of the 2021 Junior World Rally Championship. The 2021 event was based in Matosinhos in the Porto District and was contested over twenty special stages totalling  in competitive distance.

Ott Tänak and Martin Järveoja were the defending rally winners. Toyota Gazoo Racing WRT, the team they drove for in 2019, were the defending manufacturers' winners. Kalle Rovanperä and Jonne Halttunen were the defending winners in the WRC-2 category, but they did not defend their titles as they were promoted to the top class by Toyota. In the WRC-3 category, Pierre-Louis Loubet and Vincent Landais were the reigning rally winners, but they did not defend their titles neither as they were promoted to the top class by Hyundai 2C Competition.

Elfyn Evans and Scott Martin won the rally, the first of their season. Their team, Toyota Gazoo Racing WRT, successfully defended their titles. Esapekka Lappi and Janne Ferm won the World Rally Championship-2 category, while Kajetan Kajetanowicz and Maciej Szczepaniak won the World Rally Championship-3 category. The Latvian crew of Mārtiņš Sesks and Francis Renars was the winner in the junior class.

Background

Championship standings prior to the event
Reigning World Champions Sébastien Ogier and Julien Ingrassia entered the round with an eight-point lead over Thierry Neuville and Martijn Wydaeghe. Elfyn Evans and Scott Martin were third, a further two points behind. In the World Rally Championship for Manufacturers, Toyota Gazoo Racing WRT held a twenty-seven-point lead over defending manufacturers' champions Hyundai Shell Mobis WRT, followed by M-Sport Ford WRT.

In the World Rally Championship-2 standings, Andreas Mikkelsen and Ola Fløene held a thirty-five-point lead ahead of Marco Bulacia Wilkinson and Marcelo Der Ohannesian in the drivers' and co-drivers' standings respectively, with Esapekka Lappi and Janne Ferm in third. In the teams' championship, Toksport WRT led Movisport by fifteen points, with M-Sport Ford WRT in third.

In the World Rally Championship-3 standings, Yohan Rossel led the drivers' championship, while Yannick Roche led the co-drivers' championship. Driver Nicolas Ciamin and co-driver Benoît Fulcrand set in second, followed by the crew of Teemu Asunmaa and Marko Salminen.

In the junior championship, Jon Armstrong and Phil Hall led Mārtiņš Sesks and Renars Francis by nine points. Sami Pajari and Marko Salminen were third, one point further back. In the Nations' standings, United Kingdom held aseven-point lead over Latvia, with Finland in third.

Entry list
The following crews entered the rally. The event was opened to crews competing in the World Rally Championship, its support categories, the World Rally Championship-2 and World Rally Championship-3, Junior World Rally Championship and privateer entries that were not registered to score points in any championship. Eleven entries for the World Rally Championship were received, as were twelve in the World Rally Championship-2 and twenty-five in the World Rally Championship-3. A further eight crews entered the Junior World Rally Championship in Ford Fiesta Rally4s.

Route

Itinerary
All dates and times are WEST (UTC+1).

Report

World Rally Cars

Classification

Special stages

Championship standings

World Rally Championship-2

Classification

Special stages

Championship standings

World Rally Championship-3

Classification

Special stages

Championship standings

Junior World Rally Championship

Classification

Special stages

Championship standings

Notes

References

External links
  
 2021 Rally de Portugal at eWRC-results.com
 The official website of the World Rally Championship

Portugal
2021 in Portuguese motorsport
May 2021 sports events in Portugal
2021